Brundall railway station is on the Wherry Lines in the east of England, serving the village of Brundall, Norfolk. Its three-letter station code is BDA.

The station was opened in 1844. Today it is managed by Greater Anglia.

History

The bill for the Yarmouth & Norwich Railway (Y&NR) received Royal Assent on 18 June 1842. Work started on the line in April 1843 and the line and its stations were opened on 1 May 1844. Brundall Station opened with the line and was situated east of Norwich station and west of Buckenham station. The Y&NR was the first public railway line in Norfolk.
On 30 June 1845 a Bill authorising the amalgamation of the Y&NR with the Norwich & Brandon Railway came into effect and Brundall station became a Norfolk Railway asset.

On 15 December 1845 a swing bridge over the River Wensum opened and this allowed freight trains going to and from Yarmouth via Brundall to bypass Norwich. The Eastern Counties Railway (ECR) and its rival the Eastern Union Railway (EUR) were both sizing up the Norfolk Railway to acquire and expand their railway empire.  The ECR trumped the EUR by taking over the Norfolk Railway, including Brundall Station on 8 May 1848.

By the 1860s the railways in East Anglia were in financial trouble, and most were leased to the Eastern Counties Railway, which wished to amalgamate formally but could not obtain government agreement for this until an Act of Parliament on 7 August 1862, when the Great Eastern Railway (GER) was formed by the amalgamation. Brundall became a GER station on 1 July 1862 when the GER took over the ECR and the EUR before the Bill received the Royal Assent.

In the 1870s the GER started to expand its network east of Norwich. The GER obtained powers to build a line to Cromer leaving the Yarmouth to Norwich line at Whitlingham. The opening of Whitlingham station and the new line on 20 October 1874 meant that Brundall was now separated from Norwich Thorpe by the new station.

The next development occurred in the 1880s. The GER obtained powers to build a new line from Great Yarmouth to Brundall via Acle. The new line joined the old Yarmouth & Norwich route at Brundall which was now a junction station. Brundall achieved its junction status on 1 June 1883.

With the passing of the Railways Act 1921, the GER amalgamated with other railways to form the London and North Eastern Railway (LNER) on 1 January 1923, and so Brundall became a LNER station. A new station, Brundall Gardens Halt, was opened to the west of Brundall on 1 August 1924.

On nationalisation on 1 January 1948 the station and its operations came under the management of the Eastern Region of British Railways.

Following privatisation of the railways, Railtrack became responsible for infrastructure maintenance in 1994. Following Railtrack's financial problems Network Rail took over operation of the infrastructure in 2002.

At the same time, the station's services were transferred to Anglia Railways in 1997, which was succeeded by National Express East Anglia in 2004, then known as One. In February 2012 the station and its operations were transferred to Abellio Greater Anglia.

Services

 the typical Monday-Saturday off-peak service at Brundall is as follows:

References
 Ordnance Survey (2005). OS Explorer Map OL40 - The Broads. .

External links 

Railway stations in Norfolk
DfT Category F2 stations
Former Great Eastern Railway stations
Greater Anglia franchise railway stations
Railway stations in Great Britain opened in 1844